Black Eyed Pilseung is a South Korean music production and songwriting duo made up of Rado (Song Joo-young) and Choi Kyu-sung, formed in 2014. They have produced hit songs such as Sistar's "Touch My Body"; Miss A's "Only You"; Twice's "Like Ooh-Ahh", "Cheer Up", "TT", "Likey", and "Fancy"; and Apink's "I'm So Sick", "Eung Eung", and "Dumhdurum".

Before the duo's formation, both members often collaborated with Shinsadong Tiger. Rado worked on hit songs such as 4Minute's "Volume Up", Apink's "My My" and "Hush", and Trouble Maker's "Trouble Maker" and "Now", while Choi Kyu-sung was involved in T-ara's "Roly-Poly", Hyuna's "Bubble Pop", and Beast's "Fiction".

In August 2017, the duo joined forces with CJ E&M to launch a new entertainment company called High-Up Entertainment, which became an independent company in 2018. In February 2019, the duo debuted their first boy duo 415. In November 2020, the duo debuted their first girl group STAYC.

Members

Rado
Rado (born Song Joo-young [; ; Song Juyeong]) was born on July 11, 1984. Prior to being a songwriter and music producer, he was a member of the now-defunct boy band Someday. He was also known for collaborating with rapper Dok2, starting with the 2010 EP album It's We and songs "Girl Girl" (together with The Quiett, from Thunderground Mixtape Vol. 2) and "Baby Let's Go" (together with The Quiett and B-Free, from Rapsolute Mixtape, Vol. 1), then the 2011 songs "Break Beatz" (together with Double K, from Flow 2 Flow), "That's Me" (from Hustle Real Hard) and "Come Closer/Flow2nite" (together with The Quiett, also from Hustle Real Hard), and the 2012 song "Love & Life" (from Love & Life, The Album).

Choi Kyu-sung
Choi Kyu-sung (Choe Gyuseong) was born on May 7, 1984 in Seoul.

Production discography

2014

2015

2016

2017

2018

2019

2020

2021

2022

Awards and nominations

Gaon Chart K-Pop Awards

|-
| 2015
| rowspan="3"| Black Eyed Pilseung
| rowspan="3"| Composer of the Year
| 
|-
| 2016
| 
|-
|2019
|

Mnet Asian Music Awards

|-
| 2016
| Black Eyed Pilseung
| Best Producer of the Year
|

References

External links

Production discography at Daum Music

South Korean record producers
South Korean male songwriters
MAMA Award winners